Honey Boy is a 2019 American drama film directed by Alma Har'el (in her narrative feature directorial debut) with a screenplay by Shia LaBeouf, loosely based on his childhood and his relationship with his father. The film stars LaBeouf, Lucas Hedges, Noah Jupe and FKA twigs.

LaBeouf originally wrote the script as a form of therapy while in rehab. The project was announced in March 2018, and the cast was filled out over the next two months. Filming took place in Los Angeles over the course of about three weeks.

Honey Boy had its world premiere at the Sundance Film Festival on January 25, 2019 and was released on November 8, 2019, by Amazon Studios. The film received largely positive reviews from critics, who praised Har'el's direction as well as the performances of LaBeouf, Hedges and Jupe.

Plot
In 2005, Otis Lort is a movie star who suffers from alcoholism. He crashes his car and gets into a drunken altercation with the police and is forced to go into rehabilitation.

Dr. Moreno, Otis' counselor, tells him that if he leaves the facility before they say he is ready, the court will send him to prison for his violent offenses. Moreno tells Otis that he has PTSD, which he denies repeatedly, but she encourages him to look into his past through exposure therapy.

Going back a decade earlier to 1995, Otis remembers working as a child actor, often accompanied on set by his father James, a former rodeo clown. James is four years sober but clearly on edge, manic and aggressive. The two live in a meager motel complex where a shy young woman lives across from them. Otis is in the Big Brother program at the behest of his mother, despite James's jealousy. Otis wants to go to a baseball game with Tom from the program, and James agrees if Tom comes over for a barbecue.

In 2005, Otis is shown communicating with his roommate Percy and continues therapy. He resists the process, finding it unhelpful. Returning to his memories, Otis remembers Tom coming over for the barbecue along with James throwing him into the pool and violently threatening him. When he is offered a part in a movie that will be shot in Canada, Otis calls his mother, who is unsure if James can accompany him because of his status as a registered sex offender. This causes James to begin screaming at her via Otis, who has to relay both of his parents' arguments back to each other.

In the present, after resisting therapy yet again, Otis' counselor Alec advises him to go into the woods and scream as loud as he can. James is then shown attending an Alcoholics Anonymous meeting, where he talks about his abusive stepmother, how he got into substance abuse, and while blacked out attempted to rape a woman which got him registered as a sex offender. Alone in his room, Otis spends time with the Shy Girl where the two cuddle and he gives her money.

James forces Otis with the rehearsal of his scenes over and over again, and he stops to scream at the neighbors for being too loud. Otis asks him to stop and tells him that no one else would hire him due to his status as a sex offender, and that Otis is actually in charge since James is making money off of him. In 2005, Otis thanks Alec for the advice, and continues to work with Dr. Moreno on controlling his anger.

In 1995, Otis finally confronts James and tells him he needs to start being a better father. A furious James hits him, then leaves on his motorcycle to acquire drugs at a strip club. Alone, Otis spends time with the Shy Girl, and the two are caught waking up together the next morning by James. The Shy Girl slaps James and leaves, and James asks Otis how he thinks it would feel to be criticized by his own son, and to have to resort to accepting payment from him. Otis tells James that if he did not receive money, James would not be present.

James takes Otis to a patch of marijuana plants he has been growing off the highway and smokes cannabis with him. Back in the present, Otis revisits the motel, and imagines himself finding his father there in his rodeo clown costume. He tells his father he intends to make a movie about him; James asks him to make him look good. The two ride away on James's motorcycle, which fades into Otis riding away alone.

Cast
 Shia LaBeouf as James Lort
 Lucas Hedges as Otis Lort 
 Noah Jupe as young Otis Lort
 FKA twigs as Shy Girl 
 Maika Monroe as Sandra
 Natasha Lyonne as Mrs. Lort
 Martin Starr as Alec
 Byron Bowers as Percy
 Laura San Giacomo as Dr. Moreno
 Clifton Collins Jr. as Tom
 Graham Clark as TV Dad

Production
LaBeouf based the script on his own life, with his character being based on his own father, and the title coming from his childhood nickname. LaBeouf wrote the script as a part of his rehabilitation program in Connecticut, where he was diagnosed with post-traumatic stress disorder, and his therapist encouraged him to write about his upbringing.

In March 2018, it was announced that Lucas Hedges and LaBeouf had joined the cast of the film, with Alma Har'el directing from a screenplay written by LaBeouf himself. Brian Kavanaugh-Jones, Daniela Taplin Lundberg, Christopher Leggett would produce the film under their Automatik, Stay Gold Features and Delirio Films banners, respectively. Fred Berger would serve as an executive producer. LaBeouf had shared the screenplay with Har'el, a friend and creative collaborator, who decided that she wanted to direct it.  In April 2018, Noah Jupe joined the cast of the film. In May 2018, Clifton Collins Jr., Maika Monroe, Natasha Lyonne, Martin Starr, Byron Bowers and Laura San Giacomo joined the cast of the film. In June 2018, it was announced that FKA twigs had joined the cast of the film.

Asked about how making a film based on his own life affected his rehab, LaBeouf said: 

Production began in May 2018, in Los Angeles, California, lasting 19 days.

In August 2022, LaBeouf revealed that he had taken creative liberties with the character portrayal of his father and Honey Boy was not an autobiographical depiction of his childhood. He indicated that he had regrets about the abusive nature of the father character toward him in the film, when he actually was "...so loving to me my whole life. Fractured, sure. Crooked, sure. Wonky, for sure. But never was not loving, never was not there. He was always there... and I'd done a world press tour about how fucked he was as a man." LaBeouf stated that he called his father after the Honey Boy premiere and "took accountability for all of that and knew very clearly that I couldn't take it back."

Release
The film had its world premiere at the Sundance Film Festival on January 25, 2019. Shortly after, Amazon Studios acquired distribution rights to the film and eventually released it on November 8, 2019.

Reception

Box office
Honey Boy grossed $3 million in the United States and Canada, and $258,087 in other territories, for a worldwide total of $3.3 million, against a production budget of $3.5 million. The film made $301,075 from four theaters in its opening weekend, considered a "strong" start. It expanded to 17 theaters the following weekend, making $203,272.

Critical reception
The website's critical consensus reads, "Honey Boy serves as an act of cinematic therapy for its screenwriter and subject – one whose unique perspective should strike a chord in audiences from all backgrounds." On Metacritic, the film has a weighted average score of 73 out of 100, based on 41 critics, indicating "generally favorable reviews."

A. A. Dowd of The A.V. Club wrote, "[A]s a glorified form of drama therapy, Honey Boy is fascinating".

Lindsey Bahr of Associated Press included Honey Boy as number 7 on her list of the top 10 motion pictures of 2019.

References

External links
 
 
 

2010s coming-of-age drama films
2019 drama films
2019 films
2019 independent films
American coming-of-age drama films
American filmmakers
American independent films
American nonlinear narrative films
Films about actors
Films about alcoholism
Films about child abuse
Films about dysfunctional families
Films directed by Alma Har'el
Films scored by Alex Somers
Films set in 1995
Films set in 2005
Films set in Los Angeles
Films shot in Los Angeles
Films about father–son relationships
2019 directorial debut films
2010s English-language films
2010s American films